Western Cree Tribal Council is a Tribal Council representing First Nation communities in the Peace River Country of Alberta, Canada. The council is based in Valleyview, Alberta.

Member First Nations
Current First Nation members are:
 Duncan's First Nation
 Horse Lake First Nation
 Sturgeon Lake Cree Nation

References

External links
 Western Cree Tribal Council website

First Nations tribal councils
Indigenous organizations in Alberta
First Nations in Alberta